Jornal dos Sports was a traditional Brazilian sports newspaper from Rio de Janeiro which was published between 13 March 1931 and 10 April 2010. It was the oldest Brazilian daily sports newspaper, distributed mainly in Rio de Janeiro state.

Jornal dos Sports was well known in Brazil for its distinctive pink paper, similar to that of the Italian La Gazzetta dello Sport.

Among Jornal dos Sports most famous previous owners is Mário Filho, after whom the Maracanã Stadium is named.

References

External links
 Jornal dos Sports official website

Sports mass media in Brazil
Sports newspapers
Daily newspapers published in Brazil
Mass media in Rio de Janeiro (city)
Defunct newspapers published in Brazil
Publications established in 1931
Publications disestablished in 2010
1931 establishments in Brazil
2010 disestablishments in Brazil
Portuguese-language newspapers